Al-Malazz, formerly al-Riyadh al-Jadidah ( The New Riyadh) and the Red Sea neighborhood, is a commercial and residential neighborhood and the seat of the sub-municipality of its namesake, Baladiyah al-Malaz in downtown Riyadh, Saudi Arabia. Named after the al-Malaz Square (now King Abdullah Park), it was built between 1953 and 1957 by King Saud as a housing project for government employees and was later turned into a full-fledged district. 

It the very first modern locality in the city, alongside the al-Nasiriyah district, which replaced the traditional Arab architecture with a modern one. The area is also popular for hosting several iconic landmarks, supermarkets, streets and government ministries.

History
Prior to its development and during the early days of Saudi Arabia's establishment, the area had several names such as Abu Makhruq, Wattah and al-Khirbat. The area barely had buildings or streets except an equestrian field, known as Al Malaz Square where King Abdulaziz enjoyed horse racing shows and from where the locality adopted the name Al Malaz by the end of his reign, which was later shifted to Jenadriyah Farm in 2002. After the ascension of King Saud bin Abdulaziz to the throne in 1953, he initiated the relocation of government ministries from Jeddah to Riyadh. In order to meet the accommodation needs of the employees, he launched the 'Al-Malaz Housing Project' of almost 750 villas for the same.  According to scholar Faisal al-Mubarak, Al-Malaz was a large-scale housing development encompassing 754 single-family homes, 340 apartment units, and a plethora of supporting facilities including a municipal hall, a library, a fire station, schools, a market, and recreation and health facilities.

In 1957, the first campus of Riyadh University was established in the area, followed by Riyadh Zoo. The area saw rapid development expansion during the economic boom of the late 1970s and early 1980s along with the expansion of the neighbourhood, which later included several shopping centres, schools and restaurants.

References

Neighbourhoods in Riyadh